Godfrey Kisitu (died 11 March 1993) is a Uganda midfielder who played for Uganda in the 1978 African Cup of Nations.

References

External links

1993 deaths
Ugandan footballers
Uganda international footballers
Association football midfielders
1976 African Cup of Nations players
1978 African Cup of Nations players
Place of birth missing
Year of birth missing